The Mad Scientist's Guide to World Domination is a short story anthology edited by John Joseph Adams and published by Tor Books on February 19, 2013.

Contents
The collection contains the following stories:

 Foreword by Chris Claremont
 "Professor Incognito Apologizes: An Itemized List" by Austin Grossman
 "Father of the Groom" by Harry Turtledove
 "Laughter at the Academy" by Seanan McGuire
 "Letter to the Editor" by David D. Levine
 "Instead of a Loving Heart" by Jeremiah Tolbert
 "The Executor" by Daniel H. Wilson
 "The Angel of Death Has a Business Plan" by Heather Lindsley
 "Homo Perfectus" by David Farland
 "Ancient Equations" by L. A. Banks
 "Rural Singularity" by Alan Dean Foster
 "Captain Justice Saves the Day" by Genevieve Valentine
 "The Mad Scientist’s Daughter" by Theodora Goss
 The Space Between by Diana Gabaldon
 "Harry and Marlowe Meet the Founder of the Aetherian Revolution" by Carrie Vaughn
 "Blood & Stardust" by Laird Barron
 "A More Perfect Union" by L. E. Modesitt, Jr.
 "Rocks Fall" by Naomi Novik
 "We Interrupt This Broadcast" by Mary Robinette Kowal
 "The Last Dignity of Man" by Marjorie M. Liu
 "The Pittsburgh Technology" by Jeffrey Ford
 "Mofongo Knows" by Grady Hendrix
 "The Food Taster’s Boy" by Ben H. Winters

References

External links
 
 

2013 anthologies
Fictional mad scientists
Science fiction anthologies
Tor Books books